Kelly Thomas (born 9 January 1981) is a British bobsledder who has competed since 2007. She finished eleventh in the two-woman event at the 2010 Winter Olympics in Vancouver, British Columbia, Canada.

Thomas also competed in the two-woman event at the FIBT World Championships, but did not place either in 2008 or 2009. Her best World Cup finish was 11th in the two-woman event at Altenberg, Germany in December 2009.

In her youth she also competed as a track and field sprinter and was a 100 metres bronze medallist at the 1997 European Youth Olympic Days event.

References

 

Living people
1981 births
British female bobsledders
British female sprinters
Bobsledders at the 2010 Winter Olympics
Olympic bobsledders of Great Britain